Stefan Czapsky, A.S.C. (born 15 December 1950) is an American cinematographer, best known for his collaborations with director Tim Burton on films like Edward Scissorhands, Batman Returns, and Ed Wood, for which he won several film critics' awards.

Early life and education

Born in Oldenburg in West Germany to Ukrainian parents, his family emigrated to United States while he was still an infant, and then settled in Cleveland. After studying at Case Western Reserve, he enrolled in a film studies graduate program at Columbia University, and permanently relocated to New York City.

Career

Early career 
Renowned for his “broad range of styles” working alongside directors such as Tim Burton and Boaz Yakin, Czapsky has cemented himself as a chameleon of cinematography profession. Graduating from Case Western Reserve with a BFA in the humanities and an emphasis on film history and criticism, Czapsky moved to New York where he attended a graduate program at the University of Columbia. There he transitioned into the film production business working positions such as “Assistant Cameraman, Gaffer, and Key Grip,” for productions such as After Hours, Matewan, and Q. His work alongside directors Scorsese and Cohen opened up the opportunity for him to shoot his first feature film, On the Edge. Shooting iconic stars such as Pam Grier and Bruce Dern, Czapsky was able to create the sense that these were not “Hollywood locations but rooms where human voices were heard.”

Feature films 
The independent success of On the Edge prompted Czapsky to get a cinematographer role alongside Robert Chappell for Erroll Morris’ The Thin Blue Line. A film regarded as “among the most important documentaries ever made,” it won various awards for Best Documentary (1988) from the New York Film Critics Circle, The National Board of Review, and several others. Czapsky, within the same year, quickly transitioned his style for Robert Bierman’s Vampire’s Kiss. Though a box office flop, the dark New York atmosphere captured by Czapsky provided the perfect backdrop for Nicolas Cage’s “outrageously unbridled performance,” and helped the film garner a cult following.

Some of Czapsky's most notable work is derived from his projects alongside expressionist director Tim Burton. Their first collaboration was one of Burton's most notable works in Edward Scissorhands. Czapsky's fluidity behind the lens helped to differentiate the surrealistic suburbs from the darkness of Edwards isolation giving the film an “ethereal,” atmosphere. In 1992 the duo would return to shoot Batman Returns with big names such as Michael Keaton, Michelle Pfeiffer, and Danny DeVito. Shot on a Panavision Panaflex Gold II in 35mm.  Their third and final project, Ed Wood, would serve to be their most critically successful. “Exquisitely shot in black and white,” the film won an Academy Award for Best Actor in a Supporting Role, a Golden Globe for Best Makeup and Hair styling, and a Best Cinematography award from the National Society of Film Critics.  

Czapsky's departure from his work with Burton would prompt him to explore other avenues of style within film. His next cinematography project in 1996, Matilda, saw him reunite with Batman Returns villain Danny DeVito who took on the role of director. In this children's classic, Devito and Czapsky worked together to “create a world that is slightly larger and considerably funnier than life.”

Czapsky worked with the writer-director team of Will Speck and Josh Gordon on the 2007 comedy Blades of Glory. The film, starring Will Ferrell and Jon Heder, was a commercial success, grossing $145 million in the box office off a $53 million budget.

More recently, Czapsky further diversified his genre palette working with directors Boaz Yakin  and Dito Montiel on the action movies  Safe and Fighting. The former starring Jason Statham and the latter Channing Tatum, the use of “graceful single shot sequences,” helped to capture the thrills characteristic of such movies.

Starting in 2016, Czapsky shifted his cinematography work to television, shooting episodes of Shades of Blue, Quantico, and God Friended Me.

Filmography

Television
 Shades of Blue (2016–17)
 Quantico (2017–18)
 God Friended Me (2018)
 The Equalizer'' (2021)

References

External links

Stefan Czapsky profile at the Internet Encyclopedia of Cinematographers

1950 births
Living people
American cinematographers
People from Oldenburg (city)